The 2019 Icelandic Super Cup was the 48th final in the Icelandic Super Cup, an annual game between the 2018 Úrvalsdeild champions and the 2018 Icelandic Cup champions. The match was played at Origo völlurinn in Reykjavík on 18 April.

Match

Details

References

External links
2019 Iceland Super Cup, worldfootball.net

Football competitions in Iceland
Super Cup